Sherif Mohamed Abdel-Fadil (born 2 July 1983) is an Egyptian footballer.

Club career

Ismaily
Reports linked Abdel-Fadil with a move to Al Ahly following the 2007–08 season, but the move never materialized.

Al-Ahly
In Summer 2009, Al Ahly and his rival El Zamalek began a war to sign Ismaily's defender. El Zamalek was too close to sign Abdel-Fadil, but the defender failed to agree personal terms of his contract with the Cairo club. Eventually, Al-Ahly have pulled a transfer surprise by snatching Ismaily's defender from under the noses of Zamalek. Abdel-Fadil penned a four-year contract with Al-Ahly on Friday 31 July. Al-Ahly agreed to pay EGP7.5 million in addition to the right-back, Ahmad Sedik, to complete the deal with Ismaily.

International career
Sherif was selected for the Egypt national football team preliminary squad which will defend their title in ACN 2008 in Ghana, but did not make the final squad.

References

External links
 
 

1983 births
Living people
Egyptian footballers
Egypt international footballers
Association football defenders
Ismaily SC players
Al Ahly SC players
Egyptian Premier League players